Pattanaik may refer to:

Bijayananda Pattanaik (1916–1997), Indian politician, aviator and businessman
Devdutt Pattanaik, Indian mythologist, speaker, illustrator and author
Gopal Ballav Pattanaik (born 1937), Indian lawyer, Judge of the Supreme Court of India and 32nd Chief Justice of India
Hara Pattanaik (1958–2015), Indian actor, director and screenplay writer
Janaki Ballabh Pattanaik (1927–2015), Indian politician, Governor of Assam from 2009 to 2014
Kasturi Pattanaik, Odissi dance exponent, performer, choreographer, teacher, trainer and music composer from India
Navin Pattanaik (born 1946), Indian politician, 14th Chief Minister of Odisha
Prasanta Pattanaik (born 1943), emeritus professor at the Department of Economics at the University of California
Rama Kant Pattanaik, PVSM, AVSM, YSM, Deputy Chief of the Naval Staff (DCNS) of Indian Navy and of Integrated Defence Staff(DCIDS)

See also
Devlok with Devdutt Pattanaik, Indian Hindi television series which aired on the EPIC Channel
Patanak
Patnaik
Piatnik